The Rajasthan Film Festival Award ceremony (also known as the RFF Awards) is a set of awards presented annually to honor both artistic and technical excellence of artists in Rajasthani cinema as well as in other Regional Cinema. The awards began in 2013. The 10th edition of the RFF award ceremony was held on 22 September 2022 to 24 September 2022 at Maan Place, Jaipur. Tusshar Kapoor and Mahima Chaudhry was the host of the evening with Film Critic Komal Nahta. The theme for the festival is Unity in Diversity and 24 awards will be awarded in 2 broad categories, (1) For films produced in Rajasthan and, (2) For films produced in other regions of India (except Rajasthan). In order to honor personalities that have been dedicated to the industry, a Lifetime Achievement Award is also  presented at the ceremony.

The 7th edition of the award ceremony was organized for 3 Days (26 September to 28 September, 2019) at Maan Palace, in Jaipur. Shreyas Talpade was the host of the award night. Other prominent celebrities at the ceremony included Shakti Kapoor, Satish Kaushik, Rajesh Puri, Komal Nahta, Aniruddh Dave, Neha Shree, Aniruddh Singh among others. The eighth and ninth edition of the award ceremony were cancelled due to government-imposed covid restrictions.

Last Year the award ceremony was organized for 5 Days (25 to 29 September 2018) at Maan Palace, in Jaipur. Vatsal Seth was the host of the award night and the celebrities Jeetendra Kapoor, Mithoon Sharma, Neelu Vaghela, Gajendra Chauhan, Anirudh Dave and Sara Khan made their presence. In 2017, the ceremony was held at Deep Smriti Auditorium, on 14 to 16 September 2017.

History
The first awards were presented in 2013 at Rajasthan, India. From then onwards, the awards are held at various locations of Jaipur. 

Sanjana Sharma is the founder of Rajasthan Film Festival. In its 6th edition (2018), the RRF has organized this event for 5 days. The event was started with theater competition held on 25–27 September. On 28 September, inter college dance competition was organize where several people from Rajasthani Film Industry shared their thoughts about Rajasthan cinema  and on the last day of event (29 September), awards were given to the various categories by RFF.

Award ceremonies
The following is a listing of all Rajasthan Film Festival Awards ceremonies since 2013

Awards

Rajasthani Film ( Category-A) 

 Best Director 
 Best Writer
 Best Cinematographer
 Best Actor in Leading Role
 Best Actress in Leading Role
 Best Negative Performance
 Best Supporting Performance
 Best Music Director
 Best lyrics Writer
 Best Singer (Male)
 Best Singer (Female)
 Best Movie

Other Regional Film ( Category-B) 

 Best Director 
 Best Writer
 Best Cinematographer
 Best Actor in Leading Role
 Best Actress in Leading Role
 Best Negative Performance
 Best Supporting Performance
 Best Music Director
 Best lyrics Writer
 Best Singer (Male)
 Best Singer (Female)
 Best Movie

Special Award
Life Time Achievement

Jury Members

See also
1st Award Show (Rajasthan Film Festival)

References

2013 establishments in Rajasthan
Film festivals in India
Rajasthani culture
Recurring events established in 2013
Festivals in Rajasthan